The Australian Middleweight Championship was a national Australian professional wrestling championship and was the first Middleweight Championship in Australia.

Title history

See also

Professional wrestling in Australia

References

External links

Middleweight wrestling championships
Continental professional wrestling championships
National professional wrestling championships
Professional wrestling in Australia